County Line Beach is beach park located in Solromar, an unincorporated community of Ventura County. This stretch of sandy beach is easily accessible from the adjacent Pacific Coast Highway. This popular surf spot is administered as part of Leo Carrillo State Park. The beach lies within the south coast portion of the Ventura County amidst a mostly rugged coastline that is some of the most striking and diverse coastal terrain in the County. The beach lies at the mouth of a canyon in the Santa Monica Mountains that hug the shore along the Ventura County's south coast.

Location 
The beach is the most westerly community on the Malibu Coast and is within the Malibu zip code. The area was not included within the City of Malibu when the city incorporated as it is just across the boundary separating Los Angeles County from Ventura County. Its sandy beach stretches over half a mile, bordered by the Whaler's Village Condominium complex to the east, the MariSol residential community to the North and a tract of single family beach homes on the western end.

It has a small parking lot and street parking is available along Pacific Coast Highway which is part of the Pacific Coast Bicycle Route. This is an access point for California Coastal Trail.

Recreational activities
Board surfing, body surfing, kite surfing, wind surfing and stand up paddle boarding are common activities at County Line Beach. The water quality at County Line Beach is consistently graded as an A+ by the environmental steward organization Heal the Bay. It has a beach break with good peaks for surfing, and a point break that stays glassy from the thick kelp beds.  Junior surf competitions are held there and it has received some celebrity notoriety with "Ventura County Line" being mentioned as a favorite surf spot by the Beach Boys in their 1963 hit song "Surfin' U.S.A."  Kite surfing and wind surfing are also popular at the beach.

Coastal marine habitat
Scuba diving and freediving are popular because of the easy access and a marine habitat consisting of an abundant kelp forest with numerous reefs.  When the waves are small and the water visibility is clear, diving conditions can be good to excellent. The outer reefs have an abundance of sea life and are popular among spear-fisherman when the white seabass are running. Spearfishing, kayak fishing and shore fishing are popular here.  The largest draw is for the California white seabass when it is in season typically at the end of Spring and through Summer. Pacific halibut and Calico bass are also popular game fish.

Wildlife including dolphin, whale, seals, seabirds and fish are abundant off of County Line Beach.  The large kelp forests and abundance of opalescent inshore market squid means a high biodiversity. The market (opalescent) (118,000 tons, $7,670,000) squid fishery is California's largest and most lucrative commercial fishery, off the coast from the beach. The thick kelp beds also provide an opportunity to test for radioactive contamination that could arrive in ocean currents from Japan's damaged Fukushima nuclear power plant.

See also
List of beaches in California
List of California state parks

References

Beaches of Southern California
Malibu, California
Parks in Ventura County, California
Surfing locations in California
Beaches of Ventura County, California